The 14th Independent Michigan Light Artillery Battery was an artillery battery that served in the Union Army during the American Civil War.

Service
Battery "M"  was organized at Kalamazoo, Michigan, and mustered into service on January 5, 1864.

The battery was mustered out on July 1, 1865.

Total strength and casualties
Over its existence, the battery carried a total of 239 men on its muster rolls.

The battery lost 9 enlisted men who died of disease, for a total of 9
fatalities.

Commanders
Captain Charles Heine

See also
List of Michigan Civil War Units
Michigan in the American Civil War

Notes

References
The Civil War Archive

Artillery units and formations of the American Civil War
Artillery
1865 disestablishments in Michigan
1864 establishments in Michigan
Military units and formations established in 1864
Military units and formations disestablished in 1865